Jászberény is a district in north-western part of Jász-Nagykun-Szolnok County. Jászberény is also the name of the town where the district seat is found. The district is located in the Northern Great Plain Statistical Region. This district is a part of Jászság historical, ethnographical and geographical region.

Geography 
Jászberény District borders with Hatvan District and Gyöngyös District (Heves County) to the north, Jászapáti District to the east, Szolnok District to the south, Nagykáta District and Aszód District (Pest County) to the southwest. The number of the inhabited places in Jászberény District is 9.

History 
The Jászberény District existed all the way before the closure of the districts in 1983, known as the district from the 1950s. Formerly known as Upper Jászság District, its seat was Jászberény.

As of January 1, 1984, a new administrative position came into effect, therefore, on December 31, 1983, all districts, including Jászberény District, ceased to exist. The Jászberény Neighborhood was formed from the area of the ceased district. Between 1994 and 2013 this area was part of Jászberény Subregion.

Municipalities 
The district has 3 towns and 6 villages.
(ordered by population, as of 1 January 2012)

The bolded municipalities are cities.

Demographics

In 2011, it had a population of 51,274 and the population density was 83/km².

Ethnicity
Besides the Hungarian majority, the main minorities are the Roma (approx. 2,000), German (150) and Romanian (100).

Total population (2011 census): 51,274
Ethnic groups (2011 census): Identified themselves: 47,260 persons:
Hungarians: 44,473 (94.10%)
Gypsies: 2,152 (4.55%)
Others and indefinable: 635 (1.34%)
Approx. 4,000 persons in Jászberény District did not declare their ethnic group at the 2011 census.

Religion
Religious adherence in the county according to 2011 census:

Catholic – 29,156 (Roman Catholic – 29,029; Greek Catholic – 122);
Reformed – 1,557; 
Evangelical – 70; 
other religions – 578; 
Non-religious – 6,109; 
Atheism – 453;
Undeclared – 13,351.

Transport

Road network
Main road  (W→E): Budapest... – Jászberény District (2 municipalities: Jászberény, Jászjákóhalma) – ...Dormánd 
Main road  (NW→SE):  Hatvan... – Jászberény District (4 municipalities: Jászfényszaru, Pusztamonostor, Jászberény, Jásztelek) – ...Szolnok

Railway network
Line 82 (NW→SE): Hatvan (80, 81)... – Jászberény District (4 municipalities: Jászfényszaru, Pusztamonostor, Jászberény, Jászboldogháza) – ...Újszász (86, 120)
Line 86 (N→E): Vámosgyörk (80, 85)... – Jászberény District (1 municipality: Jászárokszállás) – ...Újszász (82, 120)

Gallery

See also
List of cities and towns of Hungary

References

External links
Jászberény District - HunMix.hu
Postal codes of the Jászberény District

Districts in Jász-Nagykun-Szolnok County